The Arve is a river in France (département of Haute-Savoie), and Switzerland (canton of Geneva).

Rising in the northern side of the Mont Blanc massif in the Alps, close to the Swiss border, it receives water from the many glaciers of the Chamonix valley (mainly the Mer de Glace) before flowing north-west into the Rhône on the west side of Geneva, where its much higher level of silt brings forth a striking contrast between the two rivers.

The Arve flows through Chamonix, Sallanches, Oëx, Cluses, Bonneville, Annemasse and Geneva. Tributaries include, from source to mouth: Arveyron, Diosaz, Bon-Nant, Sallanche, Giffre, Borne, Menoge, Foron, Seymaz and Aire.

Gallery

References

Rivers of Switzerland
Rivers of France
Rivers of Haute-Savoie
International rivers of Europe
Rivers of Auvergne-Rhône-Alpes
Rivers of the canton of Geneva
Rivers of the Alps